The 1928 Auckland Rugby League season was its 19th. Devonport United won the Senior A Championship for the first time under the Devonport United name, though they had won it twice before as North Shore Albions, prior to the North Shore merger with Sunnyside. Marist 
Old Boys won the Roope Rooster trophy for the first time. This was their second major trophy after winning the championship in 1924. They also went on to defeat Devonport to win the Stormont Shield.

Ellerslie United finished last in the first grade championship and as a result had to play a promotion relegation match with the winners of the B Division which was Grafton Athletic. This was the second consecutive year they had met in this match. Ellerslie won 15-13 to retain their place in the first grade. The Grafton club then decided to amalgamate with Kingsland Rovers who were also in the B Division to gain acceptance into the 1st grade competition for the 1929 season.

Season news and summary

Senior competition
The senior club season featured over 110 matches through various competitions and did not finish until late October when suburban cricket competitions had already begun.

Grafton Athletic won the Senior B Division competition going undefeated season after they had been relegated the previous season, though they were beaten in the promotion relegation match with Ellerslie meaning they would have to stay there for another season. Point Chevalier defeated Grafton Athletic in the Stallard Cup final which was the Senior B knockout competition. The season was notable for the number of teams which played sides from other areas. Ponsonby, Richmond, Parnell, and the Northcote and Birkenhead Ramblers all played sides from north Auckland and the Waikato.

Mt Albert Club formed
Mt Albert held their first meeting at St George's Hall in Mt Albert on the evening of 3 April. Ralph Wilson chaired the meeting and George Rhodes, chairman of the Auckland Rugby League was present. It was decided that they would form a club in the Mt Albert area though they did not decide on a name at this time. They would enter teams in the third and fourth grades. During the season Auckland Rugby League made a grant of £3 to Mount Albert for a dressing shed.

Representative program
It was a very busy season, with ten representative fixtures including matches against the touring England team. Ernie Asher, Edwin Vincent Fox, and Bert Avery were appointed selectors for the representative team for the season.

Annual general meeting
At the annual general meeting of Auckland Rugby League it was noted that out of the 28 playing days during the 1927 season thirteen of them were played in wet weather; however, crowds were still good and they were happy with the growth of the game. Further developments at Carlaw Park were planned, consisting of "conveniences for ladies…extra accommodation… for players, and three more dressing rooms" at a cost of £60. There was a lengthy discussion about Ellerslie's application to join the A Grade. They had won the B Grade competition and defeated the last placed Grafton from A Grade. The annual general meeting was held at the Auckland Chamber of Commerce on Swanson Street.

Thistle Cup
The Management Committee announced at the midway mark of the senior club season that the Thistle Cup would be awarded to the A or B grade team that had scored the most points in the second round of competition. If two teams were tied then the trophy would be awarded to the team which had scored the most points for the whole season.

Ground availability
An ongoing issue for many clubs in Auckland was the availability of playing fields as the number of teams grew. During the season Northcote opened a new field at Stafford Park which is still in existence adjacent to State Highway 1 just north of the Auckland Harbour Bridge. Devonport also had a deputation present at the Devonport Borough Council meeting on 10 May to ask about the shortage of grounds in the area. The club asked for permission to use some of the spare cricket grounds for matches. Mayor E. Aldridge said there would be a ground available at Stanley Bay.

Rule changes
After Round 5 the issue of time keeping in matches at Carlaw Park was raised at the weekly Management Committee meeting. The bell had been rung in the match between Richmond and Devonport at Carlaw Park before the ball was dead which was against previously arranged rules. Agreement could not be reached on whether the timekeeper or referee should be responsible for calling time. In the end it was decided that official timekeepers should attend the Referees' Association meeting for instructions.

It was noted that the dead ball area on both fields at Carlaw Park had been reduced from 12 yards to 8 yards in accordance with the laws of rugby league.

A rule change came into effect during the season after the annual meeting of the English Rugby League. They decided that no forward at any time in the scrum could have both feet off the ground. Also forwards could not drop to one knee to attempt to hook the ball. The game in New Zealand would adhere to these rules.

Richard Stack benefit matches
 The opening weekend of the season saw four first grade matches played at Carlaw Park, though these matches were not part of the competition. The round was dedicated to Richard Stack (commonly known as Dick Stack) of the Newton Rangers who had suffered a broken leg in the Stormont Shield final the previous season and the injury was so bad Auckland Hospital staff were forced to amputate it. This meant that he was unable to continue in his profession and so the league fundraised so that he was able to start his own business. A total of £500 was taken at the gates with 10,000 spectators in attendance. The day also featured a program of boxing matches with the prizes donated back to Stack. After all the accounts were balanced it was worked out that the fund for Stack totalled £610 12/3. An oddity of the games themselves was the low scoring nature and that all four losing teams failed to register a single point. Given the timing in the season and the fact they were for charity and competition points they were largely treated as practice matches with the City Rovers side using 18 players.

Monteith Shield (First Grade Championship)

Monteith Shield standings
{|
|-
|

Monteith Shield fixtures
Round 1 saw the newly promoted Ellerslie upset Ponsonby 15 points to 8. This was Ellerslie's first ever match in the first grade. The season was ceremonially kicked off by Miss Peggy Rhodes, daughter of George Rhodes, the chairman of Auckland Rugby League Management Committee.

Round 1

Round 2

Round 3

Round 4
It was decided by Auckland Rugby League after the 3rd round that they would no longer play curtain-raiser matches by Senior A Grade teams at 1:30pm. This was due to players having difficulty getting to the ground on time as they often worked on Saturdays and had to travel from the outer suburbs. A recent example had been the Newton Rangers v Devonport match where several Newton players had arrived late and the match was so late kicking off that the second half lasted only 25 minutes instead of 40. Leslie Letton, a well known rugby player transferred from rugby union where he had been playing for Marist, and scored 2 tries for Ponsonby on debut in their 18–14 loss to Marist.

Round 5

Round 6
The match between Richmond and Ellerslie was played on the Kings Birthday holiday as part of the celebrations.

Round 7

Following the conclusion of the first round, The New Zealand Herald published the individual points tallies of all the point scorers. This was the first time this had been done. Taylor of Richmond led the standings with 46 points, Len Scott of Devonport had 33, while Craddock Dufty of Newton was third with 26 points.

Round 8

Round 9

Round 10

Round 11

Round 12
The New Zealand team was playing the 2nd test against England in Dunedin this weekend so all the Auckland players in the New Zealand side were unavailable for their club sides.

Round 13
William Mincham refereed approximately his 50th ever senior club match in the game at Ellerslie Reserve between Ellerslie and Richmond. He had begun refereeing in 1920 after retiring from playing. Mincham had represented Auckland and his son Ted Mincham and grand son Robert Mincham both represented New Zealand.

Round 14

Roope Rooster Knockout Competition
Marist won the Roope Rooster for 1928 after defeating Ponsonby in a closely contested final. It was the first time they had won the trophy in their history.

Round 1

Semifinals
Extra time was played in the Ponsonby match with Newton. Craddock Dufty was tackled into touch going for a try and the match ended a 5–5 draw with a replay required the following weekend.

Semifinal Replay

Final

Stormont Memorial Shield
Marist won the Stormont Shield (named after their former teammate William (Bill) Stormont) for the first time when they defeated the Monteith Shield champions Devonport with a late try by 9 points to 8.

Labour Day Tournament
The ‘Labour Day Tournament’ was played over two days (the official holiday, and the following Saturday). It featured Huntly from the Lower Waikato competition and Pt Chevalier who had won the second grade competition. Marist won the trophy despite having to win two games on the first day, and two more on the second. For their efforts they were awarded £50 in prize money. Future international Ted Mincham made his debut for Richmond and scored a try.

Round 1

Semifinals

Final

A Division B Division promotion-relegation match
For the second year in a row Ellerslie United and Grafton Athletic met in a match to decide who would play in the Senior A Division in 1929. Ellerslie scored a converted try in the closing stages of the match to remain in the A Grade.

Top try scorers and point scorers
Top try and point scorers for A Division, Roope Rooster and Labour Day competitions (the three competitions all A Division teams competed in).

Norton Cup (B Grade standings and results)

Norton Cup standings
{|
|-
|

Norton Cup results
Round 1 saw the opening of the new municipal ground (Stafford Park) at Northcote prior to Northcote and Birkenhead Ramblers match with Point Chevalier. The ground was opened by Northcote Mayor A. E. Greenslade who kicked off the ball to start the match. During the season Otahuhu asked the Otahuhu Borough Council for permission to take up a collection at the Princes St. Reserve and they also asked the council if they would erect a building. The council agreed to the collection but declined in regards to the building. Prior to the Round 11 matches Wirenui Mapi, the halfback of the Mangere team died after a short illness. The team wore white armbands for their match with Newton in honour of him.

Grafton Athletic won the competition after an undefeated season.

Stallard Cup Knockout Competition
In the first round of matches the referee (Mr. Hill) in the Otahuhu v Kingsland game stopped play early and awarded the game to Kingsland due to the rough play of the Otahuhu side. There were several fights during the match and the referee had difficulty keeping spectators off the field. According to the writer in the NZ Herald this “was not the first time the spectators at Otahuhu had made trouble, and they were really the cause of the players getting out of hand”.

The final saw Grafton and Point Chevalier tied at the end of normal time necessitating two extra periods of five minutes before Monaghan of Point Chevalier kicked a penalty goal to win the cup. This handed Point Chevalier their first ever senior trophy.

Other club matches and lower grades

Lower grade competitions
Richmond were awarded the Davis Points Shield for the most junior grade wins. They gained 75 points, with Devonport finishing second.

Second grade (Wright Cup)
Devonport United won the championship, 6 points clear of Remuera, Ponsonby and Newton. Many of the results were not reported so the final standings are incomplete and shows the trailing teams 8 points behind. Newton won the knockout competition with an 8-7 win over Ponsonby on September 8.
{|
|-
|

Third grade open (Walker Shield)
The championship was won by Richmond who finished 2 competition points ahead of Mount Albert though with many results not reported the standings do not reflect this. Richmond also won the knockout competition when the defeated Mount Albert on October 27. Mangere United withdrew after defaulting in round 1.
{|
|-
|

Third grade intermediate
Won by Richmond who were unbeaten with 15 wins, 8pts clear of Ponsonby. They had scored 308 points and conceded only 28. They also won the knockout competition when they beat Newmarket 15-10 in the final on September 29. Newmarket had beaten Devonport 6-3 in one semi final, while Richmond defeated New Lynn in the other semi final. The Richmond team had been together for four seasons and won the competition each year as they progressed from sixth grade to third. They had only lost one championship match in that time. Grafton Athletic withdrew after 1 round. Remuera withdrew after 9 rounds having lost all their matches to that point.
{|
|-
|

Fourth grade (Hospital Cup)
Richmond won by Richmond, 2 pts clear of Remuera. Richmond also won the knockout competition when they beat Akarana in the final by 13 points to 8 on October 13. Richmond had beaten Remuera 3-2 in one semi final, while Akarana defeated City 11-3 in the other.
{|
|-
|

Fifth grade (Endean Shield)
Akarana won the championship by 6 clear points from Devonport. Devonport beat Richmond 15–7 in the knockout final on September 15. On July 14 the newly formed Mount Albert side entered a team mid season and played 4 matches before the conclusion of the competition. Browne Bros and Geddes were a side made up of the employees of a confectionery company which entered a team in the competition. Their only win came against the Mount Albert side on July 21 when they beat them 6-4.
{|
|-
|

Sixth grade A
Point Chevalier won the championship, 6pts clear of Richmond. Richmond won the knockout competition when they beat Newmarket 5-3 in the final on October 6. Richmond had beaten Northcote 27-7 in a semi final while Newmarket beat Point Chevalier 14-0 in the other semi final. Otahuhu withdrew after 9 rounds.
{|
|-
|

Sixth grade B (Myers Cup)
Point Chevalier won the championship with a 5 point gap back to Marist. Marist won the knockout competition with a 6-2 win over Point Chevalier in the final on September 29. Point Chevalier had beaten Richmond in one semi final, while Marist beat Devonport 11-6 in the other.
{|
|-
|

Schoolboys competition
Newmarket Primary School won the championship. Otahuhu Schools won the final of the school knockout competition after defeating Onehunga Convent 13 to 3 on October 27. Otahuhu had beaten Newmarket 12-10 in their semi final while Onehunga Convent A beat Mount Albert Primary School 8-0 in the other semi final. Newton, Mount Albert, Otahuhu B, Onehunga Convent B, and Onehunga Convent C had entered teams for the knockout competition which began on September 8.
{|
|-
|

Exhibition matches
Richmond traveled north to play Hikurangi in the first rugby league match in the area. The local rugby team had become dissatisfied with their treatment by the rugby union and had switched to the league code. Richmond won the match in poor weather by 5 points to 0 with manager Ben Davis refereeing the match.

Ponsonby Tour Matches v Hikurangi

Hikurangi tour to Auckland

Exhibition matches

Representative season
The first representative fixture of the season was played against South Auckland for the Northern Union Challenge Cup which the visitors had won from Auckland in 1927. Auckland won the 1928 match by 22 points to 3. The game was played in poor weather and was notable for the number of serious injuries with Stan Prentice of Auckland breaking his nose, W. Smith of Huntly suffering a severe back injury, and Stan Raynor of Huntly breaking his ribs. All three of them were taken to Auckland Hospital.

A midweek trial match was played between the Possibles and Probables in order to select the Auckland team which was due to play the touring England side later in the season.

 Auckland trounced Canterbury in a Northern Union Cup match by 66 points to 22 with winger Roy Hardgrave (son of former Kiwi Arthur Hardgrave) running in five tries. The match was played in good conditions for the most part and was witnessed by a large crowd of 15,000.

A North Island v South Island trial match was played at Carlaw Park. The North Island team fielded a large contingent of Auckland players including Craddock Dufty, Roy Hardgrave, Hec Brisbane, Maurice Wetherill, Stan Prentice, Frank Delgrosso, A. Scott, Lou Hutt, Wally Somers, and Jim O'Brien (Marist). The North Island team was far too good, winning 44 to 8. The following week a Probables v Possibles match was played as part of the selection process for the New Zealand team to play against the touring England side. The two teams featured the following Auckland players (Probables): Craddock Dufty, Len Scott, Hec Brisbane, Allan Seagar, Tim Peckham, Wally Somers, Jim O'Brien (Marist), Trevor Hall, Alf Scott, (Possibles): J Beattie, W Hanlon, and E Cleaver.

A match was also played by Auckland in Whangarei. This was the first time an Auckland representative team had played in Northland and they were up against a fledgling North Auckland side. The area was relatively lowly populated and it was thought that they could not sustain both competitive rugby union and rugby league sides. Auckland win relatively convincingly and rugby league was to continue to struggle in the area for some time. The final match of the season saw Auckland go down to South Auckland both physically and on the scoreboard by 21 points to 7. The Auckland team was below strength.

Representative fixtures and trials

Auckland v South Auckland (Northern Union C.C.)

Auckland trial match

Auckland v Canterbury

Auckland v South Auckland

Inter Island Match

New Zealand Trial Match

England Tour Match
The entire Auckland Provincial team were Auckland club players aside from Joe Menzies

Auckland v England

Auckland v Otago (Northern Union C.C.)

North Auckland v Auckland

Auckland v South Auckland

Auckland representative matches played and scorers

Auckland players selected for New Zealand
The following Auckland players were selected in the New Zealand team to play the first test versus England at Carlaw Park: Craddock Dufty (Newton), Roy Hardgrave (Newton), Claude List (Kingsland), Len Scott (Devonport), Maurice Wetherill (City), Stan Prentice (Richmond), Frank Delgrosso (Ponsonby), Lou Hutt (Ponsonby), Wally Somers (Newton), Jim O'Brien (Marist), Reserves: Tim Peckham (Ponsonby), and Trevor Hall (Newton). New Zealand won the test by 17 points to 13 in front of 27,000 spectators. Hec Brisbane who had not been considered for the first test due to injury was selected for the second test to be played in Dunedin and replaced Len Scott in the side.

Annual general meetings and club news
Details of annual club meetings were as follows, along with notable news during the season.
Akarana League Football Club held at Carlaw Park. They stated that the 1927 season had been successful with two of their three teams winning their grades.
City Rovers Football Club held at Carlaw Park. 
Devonport United League Football Club held at the Buffalo Lodge Rooms on 19 March. During the season Devonport asked the Devonport Domain Board for permission to use the football ground for a match on 23 June and for the authority to charge spectators for entry. Permission was granted provided the charge did not exceed 1 shilling.
Ellerslie United League Football Club held at their training shed opposite the Ellerslie Railway Station on 26 March.
Glen Eden At the Auckland Rugby League's weekly Management Committee meeting in April they decided to give financial assistance to the Glen Eden Club toward paying off its ground.
Grafton Athletic held at Leys Institute in Ponsonby.
Kingsland Rovers Football Club held at Buffalo Lodge Rooms on 25 March.
Mangere United Football Club held at Cook's Hall on 26 March. During the season Wirenui Hapi the halfback of the Mangere senior team died after a short illness. The Mangere team wore white arm bands on the jerseys for their round 11 match at Carlaw Park against Grafton. 
Marist Old Boys held at Donovan's Gymnasium in Parnell. 
Mt Albert held their first ever meeting at St George's Hall in Mt Albert. It was decided that they would form a club in Mt Albert although they did not decide on a name at this time. They entered teams in the third and fourth grades. During the season Auckland Rugby League made a grant of £3 to Mount Albert for a dressing shed.
New Lynn League Football Club held at Foresters’ Hall, New Lynn on 28 March.
Newton Rangers Football Club held at Nairn's Tea Rooms on Karangahape Road.
Northcote-Birkenhead Ramblers League Football Club held at Foresters’ Hall, Birkenhead on 22 March.
Parnell League Football Club held at Donovan's Gymnasium in Parnell. It was noted at the meeting that Parnell had lost its ground as the council was going to put roads through it. They were going to make arrangements to use the Auckland Domain for training purposes.
Point Chevalier League Football Club held in the Point Chevalier Hall. 
Ponsonby United Football Club held at The Leys Institute in Ponsonby. Ponsonby were being called “Ponies” in the newspapers during the season. They played the newly formed Hikurangi during the season and also toured the area with a senior and junior team.
Richmond Rovers Football Club became the first team to play a rugby league match in Northland when they met the Hikurangi side. Their coach for the season was Ben Davis.
Auckland Rugby League Primary Schools’ Management Committee. It was stated that eight teams were entered in various competitions in 1927.
Junior Management Committee held at Gray's Buildings on 27 March.
Referees Association held at the League Rooms on 26 March. During the season they asked that a written report submitted by its members should suffice for players ordered from the field, rather than requiring them to attend judicial inquiries as it was difficult to attend.

References

External links
 Auckland Rugby League official site

Auckland Rugby League seasons
Auckland Rugby League